Shiva Amini is an Iranian women's futsal player formarly playing for Iran national team and Matin Varamin. She immigrated from Iran in 2017 and currently lives in Switzerland. Since 2009, she was no longer included in the national team because she had published pictures of herself without hijab during one of her foreign trips and had played futsal with boys. Finally, the Iranian Islamic Republic regime's harassment forced her to leave Iran and seek asylum in Switzerland. Today, she is a youth and children's futsal coach in Switzerland.

References

Living people
Iranian women's futsal players
Iranian women's footballers
Women's association football forwards
Iran women's international footballers
Iranian expatriate sportspeople in Switzerland
1991 births
21st-century Iranian women